Hascol Petroleum Limited is a Pakistani oil marketing company which is active in downstream sector. It is based in Karachi, Pakistan.

The company has distribution rights of German lubricating oil Fuchs in Pakistan.

History
The company was founded in 2001 and offered initial public offering in 2007. In 2005, it received oil marketing license from the government.

In 2014, the company was listed on the Karachi Stock Exchange. In 2017, the company announced that it was investing , in collaboration with Fuchs, to setup new plant in Bin Qasim, Karachi. In the same year, it became second-largest oil marketing company in the country.

Vitol, global commodities trader, acquired percent and 15 percent shares in Hascol between 2015 and 2016, and in October 2019, Vitol announced that it was raising its shareholding upward to 41 percent.

The company had its assets frozen by the High Court of Sindh upon request of the company's creditors.

See also
 Puma Energy Pakistan
 Pakistan State Oil

References

Companies based in Karachi
Energy companies established in 2001
Pakistani companies established in 2001
Oil and gas companies of Pakistan
2007 initial public offerings
Pakistani brands
Companies listed on the Pakistan Stock Exchange
Automotive fuel retailers